1987 Australian Rally Championship was the 20th season of the Australian Rally Championship. The drivers' championship was won by Greg Carr driving an Alfa Romeo GTV-6, with the navigators' championship going to Carr's navigator in five of the six events, Fred Gocentas. Carr was the only driver to finish every rally.

Calendar

Results

Rallies

Championship points
Only the top five are shown.

Drivers' Championship

Navigator' Championship

References

1987 in Australian motorsport
Rally competitions in Australia
1987 in rallying